Scott Petersen (born 1970) is an American professional golfer.

Scott Petersen may also refer to:
Scott Petersen, of the band Nonfiction
Scott Petersen (runner), see 1997 World Championships in Athletics – Men's 1500 metres

See also
 Scott Peterson (disambiguation)